The Centre de détection et de contrôle militaire (CDC) are the French military air traffic control regional centres, that would respond to a threat within French airspace.

History
CDC Riesling, for the north-east of France, at Drachenbronn Air Base, closed on 17 July 2015, due to budget cuts in October 2014.

Structure
There are currently three French CDC centres in operation. One closed in 2012, and another has been made dormant in 2015 - its equipment is still there, but it is not in operation currently.

CDCs
 Cinq-Mars-la-Pile for north-west France
 Mont-de-Marsan Air Base (also home of two Rafale squadrons and CEAM, the French Air Force test centre) for south-west France
 Lyon – Mont Verdun Air Base for the South-East.

See also
 Centre en route de la navigation aérienne (CRNA), the five regional civilian ATC centres across France, controlled by Direction des Services de la navigation aérienne (DSNA)
 NATO CRC centres

References

External links
 Cinq-Mars-la-Pile

Air traffic control centers
Air traffic control organizations
Military units and formations of the French Air and Space Force